The Abkhazian State Television and Radio Broadcasting Company is Abkhazia's public television and radio broadcaster, founded in 1976. Its sole TV channel, Apsua TV, started broadcasting on November 6, 1976.

On September 10, 1991, the State Committee for Television and Radio was transformed into the Abkhazian State Television and Radio Company.

List of General Directors

See also
Media of Abkhazia

References

External links
 Abkhazian State Television and Radio Broadcasting Company website

Publicly funded broadcasters
1976 establishments in Abkhazia
State media
Companies of Abkhazia